Michigan's 13th congressional district is a United States congressional district in Wayne County, Michigan. It is currently represented by Democrat Shri Thanedar.

The district includes portions of Detroit and some of its suburbs, and since the 2012 redistricting, has been the only congressional district in Michigan to be contained within a single county. District boundaries were redrawn in 1993, 2003, 2013, and 2023 due to reapportionment following each respective census.

A special election was held on November 6, 2018, following the resignation of Representative John Conyers. Brenda Jones won the special election to fill the remainder of Conyers term in the 115th Congress. Democrat Rashida Tlaib won the regular election for the term in the 116th Congress. Tlaib was redrawn into the 12th district after the 2020 redistricting cycle.

Cities in the district since 2023
 Allen Park
 Dearborn Heights (portions)
 Detroit (portions)
 Ecorse
 Grosse Pointe
 Grosse Pointe Farms
 Grosse Pointe Park
 Grosse Pointe Shores (Wayne County portion)
 Grosse Pointe Woods
 Hamtramck
 Harper Woods
 Highland Park
 Lincoln Park
 Melvindale
 River Rouge
 Romulus
 Southgate
 Taylor
 Wayne
 Wyandotte

2002 redistricting
Following the 2000 census, the congressional apportionment for Michigan was reduced by one and redistricting resulted in the land area of the 13th district (as well as several others) changing significantly. Prior to 2002, the 13th district encompassed a large portion of western Wayne County and part of eastern Washtenaw County. Following redistricting, the new 13th district incorporated most of what had formerly been the 15th district, as well as a large portion of the 14th district and part of the 16th district.

Before redistricting, the old 15th district included Lincoln Park, Ecorse, River Rouge, Hamtramck, Grosse Pointe Park, Grosse Pointe Shores, and Grosse Pointe Farms. It also included all Detroit south and east of a line beginning at the point where Greenfield Road intersects the Dearborn border, heading north along Greenfield until it reached Lyndon Avenue. At Lyndon the line headed east to Livernois, although there was a small area on the south side of Lyndon just east of Schaffer Avenue that was in the 14th district. The boundary line then went about a block south on Livernois until it reached Doris Avenue. It followed Doris to Linwood Avenue (not to be confused with Lyndon Avenue) where it went not even a normal block's length south to go on Oakman Blvd. until it reached the Highland Park City line. The boundary ran along the west and south sides of Highland Park until the point where Highland Park meets Hamtramck. From that point, the boundary ran along the western and northern boundary of Hamtramck and then the eastern boundary of Hamtramck, until the point where the boundary intersected Brockton, which was then followed in a north-easterly direction until the intersection of Brockton and Mt. Elliot. At Mt. Elliot the boundary turned south until intersecting Georgia Avenue, and then proceeded east along Georgia Avenue. Where the boundary intersected Van Dyke Avenue it turned north until it intersected Ginnell Avenue, where it again turned east. The boundary followed Grinnell Avenue until it intersected Harding Avenue, where it turned south east for a block to where it intersected Gratiot and then turned to going Northeast.

The boundary followed Gratiot until it intersected Houston Whittier St, at which point it again turned east, following Houston Whittier until intersecting Kelly Road. The boundary then followed Kelly Road in a northeasterly direction until intersection Grayton Road, which went east by southeast. It followed Grayton until intersecting I-94 which it essentially followed north-eastward until it intersected the Grosse Pointe line.

The simple differences between the old 15th and the new 13th districts are that the new 13th includes Grosse Pointe Shores, Grosse Pointe Woods and Harper Woods as well as Wyandotte, and no longer includes Hamtramck. The change in its part of Detroit is harder to explain, but it now touches 8 Mile Road. The portion of the district north of Tireman and west of Livernois has been moved to the 14th district. East of Livernois the boundary has been moved about 12 blocks south to about Courtland Street. It generally follows this line until intersecting with the Highland Park border. Highland Park remains in the 14th district. Hamtramck's western border where it touches Detroit and then its southern border forms the district line. This is then true of Hamtramck's eastern border, and then its northern border until this intersects Conant. Where the northern border of Hamtramck goes east of Conant, Conant becomes the western border of the 13th district. The boundary then follows Conant in a northeastward direction until it intersects Dequindre which it follows to Eight Mile. Thus the area north of the old district line east of Conant was all transferred from the 14th district to the 13th district.

The district's area had a population that was 60.8% African American in 2000, which was down from 69.9% African American in the old 15th district in 2000. The area of the 15th district had been 70% African-American in 1990. These figures are not 100% comparable since the 1990 census did not allow marking more than one race while the 2000 census did.

Pre-1992 district 
Before 1992, the 13th congressional district was a Detroit-based district represented by Barbara-Rose Collins. Besides Downtown Detroit, the south-west portion of the city, Mid-town, areas south of Highland Park, and the southern East Side, the district also included Grosse Pointe Park and Grosse Pointe City. During the 1980s, the 13th congressional district lost the most population out of any district in Michigan. However, due to the common interpretation of the Voting Rights Act, which mandates multiple districts in areas with racial majority-minority populations, it was not eliminated in the 1992 redistricting, only renumbered as the 15th district.

Election results from recent presidential races

Election results from statewide races

List of members representing the district

Recent election results

2012

2014

2016

2018 special election

2018

2020

2022

See also

 Michigan's congressional districts
 List of United States congressional districts

Notes

References 
 Hansen Clarke's web page
 Govtrack.us for the 13th District – Lists current Senators and representative, and map showing district outline
 U.S. Representatives 1837–2003, Michigan Manual 2003–2006
 
 
 Congressional Biographical Directory of the United States 1774–present
 United States Congressional District Shapefiles 

13
Constituencies established in 1915
1915 establishments in Michigan